The Jordan River is a  tidal river in Hancock County, Maine, flowing to Mount Desert Narrows, the waterway that separates Mount Desert Island from the mainland.  The Jordan River forms the boundary between the towns of Lamoine and Trenton.

See also
List of rivers of Maine

References

Maine Streamflow Data from the USGS
Maine Watershed Data From Environmental Protection Agency

Rivers of Maine